The Uil is a river of Aktobe, Atyrau and West Kazakhstan regions, Kazakhstan.

Course
It has its sources in the Mugodzhar Hills and has many tributaries. Finally it discharges into lake Aktobe in the Caspian Depression.

See also
List of rivers of Kazakhstan

References

Rivers of Kazakhstan
Aktobe Region
Atyrau Region
West Kazakhstan Region